Ambenob Rural LLG is a local-level government (LLG) of Madang Province, Papua New Guinea.

Wards
02. Furan / Sisiak
03. Korong / Opi
04. Kamba / Kuris
05. Siar / Wadan
06. Riwo / Nagada
07. Amron / Baitabag
08. Budad Haven
09. Gegeri Wangar
10. Ward 10
11. Bagupi / Saruga
12. Abar / Labting
13. Baiteta / Hipondik
14. Balima / Kusubar
15. Aiyap / Malac
16. Sein
17. Bahor Sahgala
18. Ward 18
19. Amele / Omuru
20. Bau / Umun
21. Bemahal / Fulumu
22. Arar/ Maneb
23. Asikan/ Utu

References

Local-level governments of Madang Province